Francis Reuschlein (February 8, 1834 – April 24, 1913) was an American businessman and politician.

Born in what is now Baden, Germany, Reuschlein emigrated to the United States in 1852 and settled in Burlington, Wisconsin. Reuschlein was in the mercantile and insurance businesses. Reuschlein served as postmaster of Burlington from 1887 to 1891 and was a Democrat. He also served as Burlington town clerk, Racine County, Wisconsin court commissioner, justice of the peace, and oil inspector. Reuschlein also served on the board of education. In 1893, Reuschlein served in the Wisconsin State Assembly. Reuschlein died at his home in Burlington, Wisconsin.

Notes

1834 births
1913 deaths
German emigrants to the United States
People from Burlington, Wisconsin
Businesspeople from Wisconsin
School board members in Wisconsin
Democratic Party members of the Wisconsin State Assembly
People from Baden
19th-century American politicians
19th-century American businesspeople
Wisconsin postmasters